Newton Municipal Airport  is a county-owned, public-use airport located three nautical miles (6 km) northeast of the central business district of Newton, a city in Newton County, Texas, United States.

Facilities and aircraft 
Newton Municipal Airport covers an area of 92 acres (37 ha) at an elevation of 322 feet (98 m) above mean sea level. It has one runway designated 14/32 with an asphalt surface measuring 4,000 by 60 feet (1,219 x 18 m).

For the 12-month period ending September 26, 2008, the airport had 600 general aviation aircraft operations, an average of 50 per month. At that time there were four aircraft based at this airport: 50% single-engine and 50% ultralight.

References

External links 
 Newton Municipal (61R) at Texas DOT Airport Directory
 Aerial image as of January 1996 from USGS The National Map
 

Airports in Texas
Transportation in Newton County, Texas